Canada's Worst Driver Ever was the ninth season of the Canadian reality TV show Canada's Worst Driver, which aired on the Discovery Channel. As with previous years, eight people, nominated by their family or friends, enter the Driver Rehabilitation Centre to improve their driving skills. This season brought back nine former contestants, who were either named Canada's Worst Driver or failed to graduate in the final episode of their respective seasons, giving them one more chance to improve their driving and avoid being named Canada's Worst Driver Ever. This year, the Driver Rehabilitation Centre is located at the now-defunct Dunnville Airport in Dunnville, Ontario for the fourth straight season. The initial drive started in Thorold, Ontario and the final road test occurred in Hamilton, Ontario.

Experts
 Cam Woolley is the show's longest-serving expert, having been present in every season except the first and has seen the habits of Canadian drivers change drastically since 2000, with the most common offense having changed from DUI to distracted driving over the previous decade. He is the traffic expert on CP24 in Toronto and had a 25-year career as a traffic sergeant with the Ontario Provincial Police. As the longest-serving expert on the panel, Cam is already familiar with every returning driver except Chris.
 Philippe Letourneau is a veteran high-speed driving instructor who counts BMW and Ferrari among his clients. Since joining the show in the third season, the average car has gained considerably in speed and acceleration, with the high-speed emphasis of this season making his job a particularly important one. As the second-longest-serving expert on the panel behind Cam, Philippe is already familiar with every returning driver except Chris, Henrietta and Michael.
 Shyamala Kiru is the show's resident psychotherapist and relationship expert, a position which has become more demanding each year since joining the show in the seventh season, as the stresses in driving and everyday life seem to always be on the increase. As the second-shortest-serving expert on the panel behind Tim, the only returning drivers Shyamala is already familiar with are Kevin, Shirley and Sly. With Shyamala returning for her third season, that ties her with Dr. Louisa Gembora, the psychologist from seasons three-five of Canada's Worst Driver, as the longest-serving psychologist so far.
 Tim Danter is in his second season as the show's head driving instructor. In this position, he not only gives the drivers help and instructions for challenges, but gives them further lessons off-screen. As the shortest-serving expert on the panel, the only returning driver Tim is already familiar with is Kevin. With Tim returning for his second season, that officially makes Dan Bagyan, the head instructor from the fourth season, the shortest-serving head instructor in Canada's Worst Driver history.

Contestants
This season saw nine former contestants returning from previous seasons. However, it also has the fewest graduates so far with only four. Six of them returned with their original nominators and two (Dale and, initially, Michael) joined with new nominators, while Chris returned without a nominator with him. The only season to see no contestants returning is Canada's Worst Driver 4.
 Shelby D'Souza, 37 and licensed for 11 years, from Calgary, Alberta, was nominally the runner-up in the third season, though, in a way, was the "worst driver" from that season since the actual worst, Jason Zhang, immediately gave up driving for good following his terrible road test performance in Barrie that included stopping while merging onto Ontario Highway 400. Shelby and his brother, Elerick, feel that regardless of the outcome, he is now a much better driver. He drives a black Chevrolet Avalanche and drove a black Mitsubishi Outlander to the rehab centre.
 Christopher "Chris" Ferguson, 40 and licensed for 21 years, from Malton, Ontario, was the first-ever person to be judged the worst in the first season due to a terrible road test performance in Montreal despite a strong start. In the eight years since, however, he believes that he has hugely improved as a driver and will have much better luck this time around. His wife, Michelle, was his nominator, but she did not accompany him during his second appearance on the show (turns out, she didn't need to). He drives a black Mazda 5 and drove a white Pontiac G6 to the rehab centre.
 Henrietta Gallant, 68 and licensed for 42 years, from Summerside, Prince Edward Island, was judged the worst in the second season due to a terrible road test performance in Toronto-- which she failed to complete, no less-- and refusing to admit fault for her mistakes. While her husband, Andy, acknowledges that she has at least learned to take responsibility for her errors in the seven years since, both of them fear that it may be too late for her to learn what she needs to (at 68, Henrietta is also the show's oldest-ever contestant). She drives a gray Chevrolet Impala.
 Sly Grosjean, 42 and licensed for 19 years, from Red Deer, Alberta (moved to Nanaimo, British Columbia on Vancouver Island), was the runner-up in the seventh season thanks to a decent road test performance, despite a terrible overall track record in the competition. His brother-in-law, Fred Hillyer, disagrees with the experts-- three of which, Shyamala, Phillipe and Cam, were on the panel during Sly's original appearance-- and believes that Sly avoided being named the worst simply through luck as fellow contestant, Shirley Sampson, bombed her road test (an opinion Andrew himself shared during that season's finale) and points to Sly's continued use of handheld electronic gadgets while driving as proof that Andrew was right with his opinion that Sly got lucky that Shirley sucked on her road test, as he learned absolutely nothing from his original appearance. He drives a silver Jeep Patriot and drove a purple Pontiac Montana SV6 to the rehab centre.
 Angelina Marcantognini, 30, from Sudbury, Ontario, was judged the worst in the fifth season after a horrific overall performance, which saw her fail all but one challenge during that season (the Reverse Flick was the only challenge she passed, albeit with Andrew's help) and, like Henrietta Gallant in the second season, fail to complete the road test, in turn causing Andrew to informally judge her to be the show's worst-ever driver in the Canada's Worst Driver: U Asked! special prior to the start of the previous season. Angelina is determined to prove Andrew wrong, but her best friend, Christine Latondress Andrews, has seen little to no improvement whatsoever in the years since and is worried she'll just prove him right. She drives a black  Chevrolet Malibu.
 Dale Pitton, 65, from St. Catharines, Ontario, was the runner-up in the sixth season, thanks to finishing the road test in Niagara Falls, unlike the actual worst, Lance Morin, who couldn't even go five minutes without suffering an anxiety attack. Her disregarding the experts' recommendation that she quit driving caused a rift between Dale and her original nominator and nephew, John, midway through that season, subsequently forcing her to call on another nephew, Danny, to accompany her to rehab this time around. She drives a blue Chevrolet Cavalier.
 Shirley Sampson, 62 and licensed for 47 years, from Donkin, Nova Scotia, performed reasonably well for most of the seventh season, only to be named the worst after a disastrous road test performance in Hamilton that included stopping while merging onto and merging off the Chedoke Expressway. In the two years since, she has continued to improve her driving and now, she and her daughter, Janis Wall, are both determined to prove that she had a bad day when she was named the worst. She drives a blue Toyota Matrix and drove an orange Chevrolet Cobalt to the rehab centre.
 Kevin Simmons, 26, from Burnaby, British Columbia (near Vancouver), fresh from being named the joint-worst (with Flora Wang) in the previous season, has been brought straight back to rehab by his boyfriend, Lenny Stone. Since the previous season, Kevin has already been involved in another serious accident and Lenny is starting to feel that Kevin should follow Jason Zhangs lead from the third season and give up driving for good (something Kevin said was stupid during his original appearance). He drives a white Ford Crown Victoria and drove a blue Chevrolet Malibu to the rehab centre.
 Michael Telford, 47 and licensed for 31 years, from Vancouver Island, was the runner-up in the second season, performing reasonably well for most of the season, but ultimately turning in a poor road test, in which, despite committing the fewest moving violations with six, he took just over three hours to complete. His longtime friend, Yolanda Kozak (the wife of his original nominator, Eric, who was originally unable to return for health reasons), believes that Michael's driving is now even worse than his first appearance-- and even more so than that season's worst, Henrietta Gallant, if that's even possible-- and that he will get involved in a fatal accident unless he returns to rehab. However, after learning that Yolanda was constantly giving negative feedback, the producers decided to send her home and bring back Eric, who had since recovered. Michael drives a green Lincoln Continental and drove a black Chevrolet HHR to the rehab centre.

Synopsis

 The contestant became Canada's Worst Driver Ever.
 The contestant was runner-up for Canada's Worst Driver Ever.
 The contestant was on the panel's shortlist.
 The contestant left the show without permission and injured themselves and therefore unable to continue in the competition.
 The contestant graduated.
 The contestant was sent from the Driver Rehabilitation Centre to a psychological clinic and is out of the running for Canada's Worst Driver Ever.
 The contestant was deemed ineligible to take part in the show and sent home.
 The contestant's nominator was changed during the show.
 The contestant was not the worst driver or even the runner-up, but failed to graduate from rehab.
 Non-Elimination Week, due to all contestants wanting to remain at the Driver Rehabilitation Centre.
 Non-Elimination Week, due to all contestants failing The Longest Reversing Challenge Ever.
 Although Dale was expelled from the Driver Rehabilitation Centre, she was brought back for the trophy presentation because the experts believed she could have been named Canada's Worst Driver Ever even though she didn't participate in the final challenges.

Episode 0: Remember...
Original airdate: October 21, 2013
Andrew introduces each of the returning drivers through a review of their performances during the final road test in their original appearances. At the end of the episode, he briefly outlines the challenges that they will face and restates his personal belief that Angelina is Canada's Worst Driver Ever, though says that he is willing to be proven wrong.

Episode 1: They're Back!
Original airdate: October 28, 2013
 The Drive to Rehab: This season, the journey to the Driver Rehabilitation Centre starts from Thorold Auto Parts and Recycling in Thorold, Ontario, with the nine returning drivers heading back to rehab using a provided set of instructions, a journey that Andrew notes is an hour-long drive. The contestants depart in the following order: Michael, Dale, Shelby, Henrietta, Sly, Kevin, Shirley and Chris (who volunteers to drive Angelina to rehab, as she was too hung over from spending the previous night drinking heavily). Except for Chris and Henrietta, everyone makes a large number of moving violations on the way to rehab and the contestants arrive in the following order: Shelby (who, in stark contrast to his slow driving from Canada's Worst Driver 3, actually broke the speed limit more than once), Michael (who ran a stop sign only minutes into his drive and continued to demonstrate his habit of holding his breath in tunnels, though his driving was most certainly not helped by Yolanda's nagging), Dale (who kept stopping at green lights and then hit the barrier when parking up), Henrietta (who drove , the longest drive in years), Sly (who ran two stop signs due to not even knowing what they're supposed to look like, causing Andrew to re-iterate his belief that Sly was really the worst driver from his season and should give up driving completely), Shirley (who, despite the confident predictions of Janis and Andrew that she will do well this season, made a careless mistake, nearly driving into the occupied intersection of Thorold Road and South Pelham Road, having to be stopped from doing so by Janis), Kevin (who failed to compensate for his limited vision and nearly collided with a truck; upon reaching rehab, he tells Andrew that should he be named the worst-ever, he will surrender his driver's license and sell his car) and Chris (who had to stop so Angelina could get out and vomit).
First to Arrive: Shelby was the third to leave, but the first to arrive.
Last to Arrive: Chris was the last.
 Camaro Challenge: Basic Assessment: After revealing that this year's recurring challenge car will be a Camaro SS (painted in a flag-inspired livery, similar to the 2009 Dodge Challenger RT used in the seventh season and had to be buried at the end of that season), Andrew walks through the basic assessment that each driver will undertake. The challenge itself is basically the same as the previous season, albeit with the first two sections flipped around; firstly reversing through a course of wheel rims, followed by a U-turn in a section of concrete barriers and finally a slalom between foam people at 50 km/h. Angelina is first up and gets off to a predictably bad start, knocking over a set of wheel rims before Andrew can even finish his introductory speech. Despite Christine's best efforts to guide her, Angelina knocks over nearly every set of wheel rims, dents and scrapes the Camaro in the U-turn and then her wedge shoes get stuck on the accelerator in the slalom, causing her to drive at an inconsistent speed and hit most of the foam people. Dale's run is near-identical to Angelina's, as she never uses her mirrors in the reverse segment, causes even more damage to the car's bodywork in the U-turn and goes significantly under-speed in the slalom. Kevin does even worse than either Angelina or Dale, not using his mirrors once in the reverse section (which takes him over 20 minutes to complete), nearly tears off the Camaro's front bumper in the U-turn and then goes completely off the course during the slalom. Henrietta does a little better in the first two segments, albeit with extensive coaching from both Andrew and Andy, but goes under-speed in the slalom and hits several foam people. Chris, who has Andrew in the passenger seat, has by far the best run of the day, not knocking down a single wheel rim, only experiencing a very low-speed collision in the U-turn and executing the slalom flawlessly. Sly's main issue in the reversing section, surprisingly, turns out to be being over-cautious; he completes it while only knocking a few rims down, but takes more than half an hour to do. However, his run rapidly falls apart in the U-turn as he rips off the Camaro's rear bumper, then drives with only one hand on the wheel in the slalom, going far too wide and completely missing the required turns. Michael does quite well in the reverse section, only hitting three rims, but then seriously bumps and scrapes the car in the U-turn, before trying to take the slalom at 80 km/h and violently spinning off-course, which reduces Yolanda to tears. Shelby, in a more familiar turn of events, is the slowest performer of the day, taking over 40 minutes to complete the reversing course (though he hits fewer rims than many of the other drivers). After that, he can't even complete the U-turn and so is allowed to bypass to the slalom, where his repeated under-steering causes him to fail. Shirley initially struggles in the reversing course due to trouble aligning herself correctly, but soon picks it up, then executes the U-turn flawlessly, but like Shelby, under-steers on the slalom and fails, though is still the only driver besides Chris to successfully complete any of the segments. 
Best Performer: Chris and Shirley were the only two people who passed at least one segment of this challenge, but Chris doing clearly better.
Worst Performer: Kevin did the worst, going off course during the slalom and not using his mirrors.
The drivers then have their initial meeting with the experts. Michael asks Philippe to go over the footage of his slalom spin-out with him and Philippe tells him his mistake was driving too fast and not looking where he wanted to go, instead directly staring at the foam people. Sly is also called out for making the same mistake in his run. Henrietta admits that since Andy retired shortly after Canada's Worst Driver 2 aired, he usually drives the couple everywhere and she doesn't usually drive more than a dozen times per year. Shelby thinks he might be Canada's Worst Driver Ever; Andrew tells him that he probably isn't that bad, but that he could still benefit from more rehab (Shelby also expresses shock that Angelina really is as bad as her reputation suggests). The remaining drivers all deny that they may be Canada's Worst Driver Ever. Due to the exceptionally awful performances by most of the drivers, the experts agree to graduate one person immediately so as to give the remainder their full attention and very quickly decide on Chris. However, Cam raises the issue that Henrietta would not realistically benefit from rehab, since she drives so rarely and that they would be better served sending her home, graduating Chris and focusing on the remaining seven. Ultimately, Andrew gives Henrietta her license back, after which Andy drives her away. Andrew then further surprises the drivers by announcing that Chris, clearly the most skilled of the group, goes from being the first-ever worst driver to the first graduate.

Note: This episode did not display an opening title screen or broadcast the opening animation.

Episode 2: Where's Your Blind Spot?
Original airdate: November 4, 2013
Running the Rails: This challenge, previously run in Canada's Worst Driver 6, places the drivers at the wheel of a RAV4 and requires them to approach a short track made up of two rails, drive onto it and follow the rails to the end and then reverse off it. The drivers have only one chance and falling off and being unable to continue will result in an immediate fail. Michael is the first to take the challenge, though Yolanda is unable to accompany him, as she has a congenital hip defect which has been exacerbated by her being involved in car crashes. Michael completes the forward part without much difficulty, but then gets dangerously close to the end of the track and drives completely off it after accidentally putting the RAV4 in first gear instead of reverse, though Andrew still notes that he seems reasonably aware of where his wheels are. Dale, who failed this challenge three years earlier when she didn't even get aligned, doesn't even manage to get fully on the track before falling off and fails. Kevin, despite Lenny's coaching, only gets halfway up the track and falls off after accidentally steering into the side of the track he was about to fall off of. Angelina refuses Christine's advice to adjust her mirrors and proves so unaware of where her wheels are that she takes six attempts to get onto the rails and then falls off immediately. Unlike Dale, however, she is able to back out and retry though, on her next attempt, falls off halfway and fails. Despite Janis' constant panicking (which causes Shirley to call her "worse than Angelina," a statement which greatly offends Janis), Shirley executes the challenge flawlessly. Shelby does well on the forward section, but his failure to adjust his mirrors (Elerick deliberately neglecting to tell him to do so) causes him to fall off halfway through reversing. Sly constantly attempts to solicit Fred's advice in the challenge, but like Elerick before him with Shelby, Fred refuses to give any. Sly eventually gets to the end, but is mere inches from falling off. Sensing the inevitable, Fred gets out of the car and seconds later, Sly falls off, failing.
Best Performer: Shirley, as she had the only pass in the challenge.
Worst Performer: Dale, who fell off the rails and got stuck almost immediately. Angelina also failed to get the car on the rails, but was able to make additional attempts before getting completely stuck, unlike Dale.
Road Signs: Tim tests the seven drivers on their road sign knowledge, a test which it's noted all the drivers have previously been through. Of the ten signs tested, Shirley got 8/10, which was both the highest score overall and the biggest improvement over the original appearance of any driver, considering she only got 1/10 two years earlier due to outdated knowledge. Sly, Shelby, Kevin and Michael all get at least half right, though their exact scores are not revealed. Dale and Angelina post the joint-lowest scores, with only 2/10.
Crazy Eights: This test, previously run in Canada's Worst Driver 6, pits two drivers at a time against each other in a pair of Suzuki Sidekicks driving in a figure-eight course of wheel rims, with a combination of S-turns and accurate reversing required to get through the course. Shelby and Shirley make up the first heat and though Shirley needs Andrew to refresh her memory on how to perform an S-turn, both get through the course flawlessly. Dale (who drove over a rim and punctured the Honda CR-X del Sol's gas line three years earlier when she competed against then-head instructor Peter Mellor due to not having a partner after Scott Schurink was expelled) and Michael are next-up and while Michael also makes it through without any trouble at all, Dale hits 19 objects and fails. The Suzuki Sidekicks are then swapped out for two Pontiac Fieros. Kevin and Angelina make up the next heat and Kevin continues to demonstrate his problem of only ever looking forward and rarely turning his head, which causes him to run over several wheel rims and fail. Yet again, Angelina has the worst run and backs completely off the course and into a field. She attempts to give up after this, but Andrew forces her to continue and Angelina's repeated complaining causes the experts to conclude that she's emotionally immature. During the challenge, Angelina reveals that her cousin suffered brain injuries in a car crash, causing memory loss which rendered her unable to even remember who Angelina was, leaving Andrew further astonished by her cavalier attitude toward driving. Sly takes the last run alone due to the lack of another driver and, in a repeat of the initial test, is extremely slow, taking 97 minutes to get through the course.
Best Performer: Michael and Shelby, who both completed the challenge flawlessly without needing any advice. Shirley also passed, though needed a little help from Andrew at first.
Worst Performer: Even though Sly took 97 minutes to get through the course, Angelina was deemed the worst for leaving the track altogether during her run.
Camaro Challenge: The Shoulder Check Challenge: In one of the show's most frequent challenges, the drivers each have to approach a split lane at 70 km/h, and then check left and right over their shoulder to see which lane (designated by a green marker) they must turn into. Each driver has two runs. Angelina is first-up and on her first run drives at 100 km/h and closes her eyes, crashing straight through the central barrier, splitting the Camaro's front bumper in half and damaging its radiator. After the Camaro is repaired, Angelina takes another attempt and nearly gets it right, but understeers and clips the barrier. Kevin understeers on his first turn, also clipping the barrier and on his second run, he steers too early and hits the lane markers; as he and Andrew note, however, even this result is an improvement on the previous year, when he tried to cheat. Shelby gets the challenge exactly right on the first go, as does Shirley. On his first run, Sly can't even make it to the end of the straight before driving through the lane markers, due to him turning his whole body rather than just his head. He then hits the lane marker again on his second run, this time by steering too soon. On his first run, Michael drives too slowly (at just 60 km/h) and slows down further toward the end of the straight. Andrew asks Yolanda for her honest opinion and she launches into a tirade against Michael, which Andrew and the experts feel is an overreaction and theorize is caused by pent-in anger at the driving-related injuries she suffered in the past. On his second go, Michael passes with ease. Dale seems to get the technique right on her first go, but inexplicably turns into the lane she's told not to turn into. On her second go, she only checks over one shoulder and clips the central barrier, causing her to fail. 
Best Performer: Shelby and Shirley, as they both passed on their first attempt.
Worst Performer: Angelina, who failed both her runs and damaged the Camaro so badly that the challenge had to be paused while it was repaired.
Angelina has a lengthy discussion with the judges and admits that she is no longer on anti-depressants due to her original psychiatrist having retired and her being unable to find another in Sudbury. Shyamala tells Angelina that while she can't prescribe drugs, she can help her deal with her issues and Angelina agrees to as many therapy sessions as it'll take. Along with Angelina, Sly, Dale and Kevin all admit that there's no way they'll be graduating this episode, as they didn't pass a single challenge between them. This leaves Michael, Shelby and Shirley, who each had some degree of success in each challenge this episode, as the pool of potential graduates. Despite all three wanting to graduate, the judges decide that there is no need whatsoever for a discussion; Shirley, who was regarded as the most capable driver of the group (apart from Chris) even before rehab and the only driver who fully passed every challenge this episode, becomes the next graduate, with Andrew describing her as "inspirational" and saying that his only regret is that she can't be around longer.

Note: This episode did not display an opening title screen or broadcast the opening animation.

Episode 3: Splish-Splash!
Original airdate: November 11, 2013
Limo Figure-Eight Challenge: For the second time in as many episodes, the drivers are required to reverse around a figure-eight course. The driver and their nominator will sit in the driver's compartment and the other five drivers will sit in the passenger section, while the other nominators will watch from outside. Angelina volunteers to go first, apparently accepting before she begins the challenge that she's going to fail; she consequently doesn't make a serious effort and hits a whopping 36 things. As if that's not enough, thinking this is the Distracted Driving Challenge, she answers a phone call from her boyfriend, Andy, leading Michael to immediately point out how ridiculous that is, an opinion that even Sly, a habitual distracted driver in his own right, agrees with (and remember, Sly promised Andrew during his original final drive two years ago that he would never eat a sandwich, use his cell phone or touch his GPS while driving again). This, combined with her repeated temper tantrums, causes the experts to suggest that she should perhaps be expelled from rehab and referred to a psychiatric clinic. Michael gets off to a shaky start due to only using his passenger-side mirror, knocking over five objects in the opening turn, but, on being reminded to use all the mirrors on the car, quickly gets it together and doesn't hit another object. Kevin has to be coached extensively by Lenny during his run, but quickly starts to makes full use of his mirrors and, much to the shock of everyone, posts the best run on this challenge, hitting just two things. Dale gets extensively advised by Andrew, Danny and Michael during her run, but is still unable to apply their advice and ends up hitting 22 things. Despite his success in the previous episode, Shelby fares rather poorly in this challenge, failing to adequately use his mirrors and not taking into account the limo's front-end swing; despite finishing with the fastest time, he consequently hits 16 things, causing Andrew to tell him that reversing, which was a challenge to him during his first stint in rehab, is obviously still a major issue for him. Sly continues to demonstrate a severe lack of spatial awareness on top of his slow reversing speed, which makes him so slow that everybody leaves the challenge area, including eventually Fred, leaving Sly to complete the course alone. Sly ultimately hits 24 things and takes over ten minutes longer than anyone else to complete the challenge, a performance Andrew brands arguably even worse than Angelina's, if that's even possible (and remember, Angelina didn't even make a serious effort, answering a phone call during her run and ultimately hitting 36 things). 
Fastest Performer: Shelby performed the fastest at 16:46.
Slowest Performer: Angelina performed the slowest at 33:15.
Best Performer: Kevin, who hit only two things during his run, but only because Lenny extensively coached him.
Worst Performer: Even though Angelina hit more things than anyone else with 36 and took a phone call from her boyfriend, Andy, during her run, Sly was so slow that everyone except for Andrew and the camera crew walked out.
Camaro Challenge: Swerve and Avoid: In what Andrew points out is one of the most critical skills taught on the show, the drivers must avoid a foam car which will appear in one of two lanes, by swerving into the free lane. Each driver has two turns and must carry out the manoeuvre at 70 km/h. This year, the timing to successfully execute the challenge is so tight that Andrew almost fails his demonstration, getting into the correct lane with just inches to spare. Kevin is first-up and on his first attempt, he hits the brake, partly going through the central barrier and then into the adjoining field. He makes the same mistake again on his second run and fails. Shelby makes the same mistake on his initial run (and also drives too fast, at 100 km/h), but on his second attempt he correctly executes the manoeuvre and passes. Dale, who has to be reminded by Danny to take the course at 70 km/h, not 70 mph, chooses a lane before the car even appears during her first run, resulting in her turning into its lane and hitting it dead-on. On her second run, she appears to pass the challenge, but on close inspection, it turns out that she turned fractionally before the car was visible, meaning that she actually failed. Since Sly's run two years ago, in which he never turned into a lane, but instead drove through the central barrier, was considered to be the worst in the show's history, he's told to carry out his first run at just 40 km/h, but not told that no car will appear. Much to the disbelief of Andrew, Fred and the experts, Sly doesn't brake or turn into a lane and just carries on and, repeating his previous run from two years earlier, smashes through the central barrier. On his second, full-speed run, Sly drives too fast-- at around 90 km/h-- and starts turning before the car even appears, crashing into it, a result that leaves Andrew and Fred more convinced than ever that Sly is totally unfit to drive. As a result of his spin-out on the Basic Assessment Challenge, Yolanda is still refusing to accompany Michael in the high-speed challenges and so, Andrew takes her place; Yolanda's worries prove well-founded, as Michael continues to demonstrate the target fixation that caused that spin-out, crashing directly into the car on his first run. On his second run, he makes the same mistake and corrects for it somewhat, but still clips the central barrier, leaving Michael visibly angry with himself. Angelina shows up to the challenge hung over again, but insists on doing it anyway; on her first run, she drifts to one side and fails to react when the car appears and crashes through the central barrier. She drifts to one side again on her second run, hitting some lane markers, then successfully gets into the right lane, but hits more lane markers and ends up in the field. Despite this, Angelina and Christine inexplicably try to claim that she passed the challenge, causing Andrew to lash out mostly at Christine, who he accuses of failing to make a serious effort to get Angelina to improve.
Best Performer: Shelby, who was the only driver to pass.
Worst Performer: Sly, for showing a total lack of common sense by driving straight through the central barrier on his "fake run." Of the drivers who had two actual runs, Angelina and Kevin both did the worst, by spinning off-track on at least one attempt.
The Water-Tank Challenge: For this, one of the show's most notoriously tricky challenges, the drivers each have to drive at 40 km/h through an obstacle course with a  tank of water mounted on the car's roof. The car used is a Ford Taurus wagon, painted in a water-inspired livery. Any sharp acceleration or braking will result in the water draining from the tank onto the driver and their nominator. As usual, even Andrew doesn't avoid a soaking, losing only  of water in all (he deliberately accelerates and stops sharply at the end as well). Sly is first-up and his acceleration and braking are erratic throughout the challenge, resulting in him losing . Dale doesn't fare much better and loses , mostly through not properly using her mirrors. Michael keeps driving too fast, but still has what turns out to be the best run in this challenge, losing , making him the only driver other than Andrew to keep at least half the water in the tank. Kevin doesn't take the challenge seriously and keeps braking sharply, resulting in him losing . Shelby knocks over a foam person in his run, then backs over it and the shock of hitting the ground on the other side of the person fractures the tank, resulting in all  draining into the driver's compartment. Angelina doesn't participate in the challenge, instead getting a private therapy session from Shyamala. Despite the concerns of the experts that she shouldn't be in rehab, Angelina is able to talk Shyamala out of expelling her and it's agreed that she may continue on the show for now. 
Best Performer: Michael kept half the water in the tank, more than anyone else.
Worst Performer: Shelby technically did the worst, losing all his water after a freak accident; of the other drivers, Kevin did the worst, losing the most water and not making a real effort.
The experts tell Dale that she actually failed her second run on the Swerve and Avoid and Dale admits she truly believed she saw the foam car, which Shyamala feels could be a sign of a more serious overall problem. None of the drivers want to graduate, but the experts decide to draw up a shortlist anyway. Despite it being noted that Michael and Kevin did well in the Limo Figure-Eight Challenge (and Michael also had the best run in the Water-Tank Challenge), Cam persuades the others that the Swerve and Avoid is such an important skill that anyone who failed it should automatically be barred from graduating this episode, which makes Shelby the only nominee by default as he was the only one to pass the challenge. In the end, Andrew tells Shelby that he has been the best performer until now and that the experts could have seen a case for him graduating this episode, but since he said he didn't want to, he'll stay in rehab and so will everyone else.

Note: This episode did not display an opening title screen or broadcast the opening animation.

Episode 4: Easy as 1-2-3
Original airdate: November 18, 2013
Three-Point Turn: This challenge, being run in its Canada's Worst Driver 6 incarnation, requires the drivers to drive a Suzuki Sidekick along a thin road onto a small island, which is surrounded by a moat, turn the car around in no more than three steps and drive back out. Any driver who gets stuck in the moat will immediately fail. Sly is the first to take the challenge, but is completely unable to apply Andrew's advice to think of his route as a triangle and quickly backs into the moat. This, combined with him not thinking to put the car in four-wheel drive, causes him to fail. A similar thing happens on Angelina's run, as she backs into the moat early on, then throws a tantrum and lashes out at both the car and Christine, causing the experts to once again question her ability to continue on the show. Michael takes his run without anyone else in the car, as Yolanda told the show's producers she is now no longer willing to accompany Michael in any challenges whatsoever. She subsequently goes so far as to actually heckle Michael during his run. Despite this, he nearly gets it right on his first run, which ends up being a five-point turn and on his second run, he successfully carries out the turn. Dale, who got the Jeep TJ stuck in the moat three years earlier, doesn't even manage to get onto the island and drives into the moat within seconds of starting the challenge, getting stuck yet again even though Michael left the car in four-wheel drive (which Dale confuses with front-end swing when Andrew tries to tell her what it does). Shelby fails his run for the same reason, much to Andrew's shock and dismay. Kevin has the best performance on the challenge, getting a three-point turn on his first go and, shockingly, the congratulations of both Lenny and Andrew.
Best Performer: Kevin was the only driver who passed on his first attempt. Michael also passed, but needed two attempts after his first resulted in a five-point turn.
Worst Performer: Dale and Shelby, who both got stuck almost immediately.
The Trailer Challenge: For this year's incarnation of the test, the drivers each have to drive a Ford F-250 pickup towing a caravan through a course of cars and wheel rims, before reversing the caravan into a parking space. Again, Sly is the first to take the challenge and knocks over a lot of rims during the first part of the course. However, he can't figure out what to do in the reversing section and his run ends up being halted after he attempts to get out of the truck and check his position while the truck and caravan are still moving. Dale is constantly reminded by Andrew before and during her run to take turns wide to compensate for the narrower turns the caravan will take, but fails to apply his advice and causes a lot of damage during the forward section. Whether she parked up the caravan is not shown, but her run was a clear failure based on the damage caused. Shelby does even worse and during the forward section, he ends up tearing a massive hole in the caravan's body; needless to say, he fails. Michael, accompanied by Andrew in his run, gets through the forward section without hitting a single thing. However, he overthinks the reversing section (something he tended to do in the second season, in which he was the worst) and eventually gives up after being unable to get the caravan in the parking spot. Kevin continues his run of good challenges, not hitting a single thing in either direction and becoming the only driver to pass this challenge. Last-up is Angelina, who causes numerous dents and scrapes to the caravan in the forward section before completely mentally crashing in the reversing section; she ultimately gives up after coming dangerously close to hitting Andrew. As Angelina storms off in tears, Christine, herself close to tears, tells Andrew that Angelina's mental health has deteriorated sharply in the four years since her original appearance and that the reason she doesn't appear to push Angelina harder is due to the lack of any other positive reinforcement in her life, rather than Christine not caring about Angelina's bad driving.
Best Performer: Kevin, who had the only pass in the challenge.
Worst Performer: Shelby, who committed a mistake so dangerous that his run was immediately halted.
Camaro Challenge: The Eye of the Needle: In this, one of the few challenges that has been done since the beginning of the series, the drivers are given two chances to navigate a series of five arches at 80 km/h. During his demonstration, Andrew notes that, by far, the most common failing in this challenge is drivers placing themselves in the middle of the arches, subjecting their passengers to impact. During his first run, Shelby drives too fast-- at 100 km/h-- and hits all but one arch; conversely, on his second run, he's allowed to drop his speed to 50 km/h, but immediately hits the first arch, causing both Shelby and Andrew to wonder whether he might actually be Canada's Worst Driver Ever. Angelina, who is hung over yet again, insists on wearing heels for the challenge and after she hits the first arch, she goes completely off-course, stopping halfway down the track. Andrew insists that she wait until the crew can find her some flat driving shoes before she takes her next run, which causes her to angrily throw her $300 heels at Andrew. The challenge continues in the meantime and, despite Andrew's dire predictions, Dale passes her first challenge of the season; she skidded on the second arch, but was able to regain control of the car, maintain her speed and get through the rest of the course safely. In his first run, Sly hits the first arch, then locks up the brakes and crashes through the second arch before coming to a stop and then smashes off the Camaro's passenger-side wing mirror on the third arch; Andrew brands this the worst Eye of the Needle run in the entire history of the show (that is, until Angelina's second run). Sly has to wait for the show's mechanics to fit a replacement mirror for his second run and immediately smashes it again on the first arch, causing him to fail. Kevin is unable to continue his run of strong challenges, as he hits three of the five arches on his first run and despite taking his second run at a reduced speed of 60 km/h, he hits every arch and smashes the third passenger side mirror of the day. Michael, once again accompanied by Andrew, drops his speed to 60 km/h for the second and third arches, but gets back up to full speed for the fourth and fifth arches, which Andrew decides is good enough to be deemed a pass. Despite this, Yolanda furiously confronts Andrew, telling him that Michael should have failed because he didn't maintain 80 km/h throughout the run, leaving Andrew shocked, Michael dismayed and the experts believing Yolanda should be removed as Michael's nominator. Finally, with a set of flat shoes provided by the show, Angelina takes her second run; however, she closes her eyes and quickly loses control and ultimately ends up smashing every arch. After getting out of the car, Angelina angrily lashes out at Andrew and Christine for an extended period before bursting into tears. As Andrew drives the two away from the course, Angelina undergoes a complete meltdown, lamenting her life situation and the lack of any medical or emotional support (which, as revealed by Christine during the previous challenge, has caused her to resort to alcoholism and stealing prescription anti-depressants from other people) and Andrew sadly concludes that there's nothing more that the Driver Rehabilitation Centre can do for her. 
Best Performer: Michael, who passed the challenge with minimal drama. Dale also passed, but locked up the Camaro's wheels and skidded uncontrollably for a good portion of the challenge.
Worst Performer: Angelina, who destroyed the entire course and then suffered a mental breakdown at the end of the challenge.
After the challenge ends, Shyamala takes Angelina aside and gently tells her that, one way or another, her time on the show is over. Angelina is further told that she has been booked a 60-day stay at a specialist psychiatric clinic and is initially indignant about this, but ultimately accepts the offer, in part due to the strong implication that she will simply be expelled from rehab if she refuses the treatment, which would have made her the third contestant to be expelled from rehab (after Colin Sheppard in the second season and Scott Schurink in the sixth season) and the second by the experts. Angelina thus leaves the show in a taxi, as a tearful Christine waves her goodbye. However, Angelina's departure is not the only issue facing the judges, as it's also clear that Yolanda's excessive negativity and unrealistic expectations are proving detrimental to Michael's learning. Andrew tells Michael that Eric's health has sufficiently improved for him to take over from Yolanda as nominator, while Yolanda's has been failing due to pulled muscles sustained in the first episode; Michael tells the judges that while he'd be grateful to have Eric around again, he also thinks that allowing him to graduate this episode would resolve two issues at once. Kevin is the only other driver who shows any desire to graduate, though he quickly retracts his request and says that he'd benefit more from staying in rehab (a decision Kevin would later regret, as he would eventually end up in the finale); the remaining drivers all admit they don't deserve to graduate. Ultimately, the experts decide to deny Michael's request to graduate and all five stay in rehab. Andrew closes out the episode by saying that Angelina isn't really Canada's Worst Driver Ever and that, unfortunately, her problems go far beyond a simple lack of skill at the wheel. Before the credits, the show listed details of support available for those suffering depression and other mental health issues.

Note: This episode did not display an opening title screen or broadcast the opening animation.

Episode 5: They Shoot! They Score!
Original airdate: November 25, 2013
The Trough: As in nearly every incarnation of this classic challenge, the objective is to drive a RAV4 through a course made up of overturned concrete Jersey barriers, with wide turns again being paramount to success. If a driver gets stuck, they will have to restart the course, though in an attempt to discourage the drivers from being overly hasty, this time they each have a set number of four attempts rather than a half-hour period in which to get through the challenge. Prior to the challenge, Kevin sends a letter to Andrew and the experts, apologizing for his conduct in the previous season (especially referring to the notion of giving up his license as being "stupid") and vowing to start taking responsibility for his driving, which the experts appreciate. He's given the chance to back up his claims by going first in the challenge, but fails to adjust his mirrors prior to his first run and consequently falls off quickly. On his second run, he adjusts the mirrors, but does it improperly and fails again. He adjusts his mirrors properly for the third run, but forgets to actually use them and quickly fails again. On his fourth and final run, he manages to get halfway down the track, but falls off and fails. During a discussion with Shyamala prior to his run, Sly reveals that the likely cause for his appalling spatial awareness is a head injury he sustained as a teenager. Despite both Andrew and Fred being nervous during the run (in no small part due to Sly severely damaging the RAV4 he used for the challenge in the seventh season) and him failing the first two runs due to not adjusting the mirrors, Sly passes the challenge on his third attempt, though admits his success may have been down to luck as much as anything else. Michael, now with the returning Eric by his side after Yolanda was sent home, is the third driver in a row to fail his first run due to not adjusting the mirrors, though he quickly gets the hang of the challenge and passes on his third attempt. Dale (the only female nominee remaining after Angelina left rehab for a 60-day stay at a psychiatric clinic last episode) has the worst performance on this challenge, never making it more than a third of the way down the course and showing such a lack of awareness of where her wheels are that Danny has to tell her every time she's fallen off. By contrast, Shelby has the best run, as he remembers to adjust his mirrors, immediately realizes his mistake when he falls off during his first attempt and passes with ease on the second go.
Best Performer: Shelby, who completed the challenge faster than anyone else.
Worst Performer: Dale, who never got very far up the trough and needed Danny to tell her whenever she'd gotten stuck.
Car Hockey: In a variation of a challenge previously run in the fifth season, the drivers each have to push an oversized hockey puck (as opposed to the shopping cart used previously) from a red line down a short track using a Honda Prelude and shoot the "puck" at a goal while remembering to stop the car before a blue line. Incredibly, none of the drivers score a single goal on any of their attempts; Kevin only gets one puck all the way down the track and sends it wide, Dale goes so slow that her pucks never reach the goal, Shelby doesn't get any of his pucks down the track, Michael only gets one to the scoring area and goes too slow to get it to the goal and Sly only gets two into the scoring area, which prove to be way off-target. Andrew then announces a "sudden death" round and gives the drivers additional instructions on how to score, but Michael, Sly, Shelby and Dale all fail before Kevin finally scores, winning the challenge.
Best Performer: Kevin, as the winner of the "sudden death" round.
Worst Performer: Dale and Shelby, since they never once got a puck into the scoring area, which Michael and Sly at least managed despite not scoring.
However, the objective of having to reverse down a long course (this time in a Trans Am) while hitting as few obstacles as possible still remains. Dale is completely unable to keep the Trans Am in a straight line and ends up hitting 36 objects, mostly on the passenger side. On his run, Kevin constantly ignores Lenny's advice to look out the back window and spends most of the challenge looking forward, hitting a substantial number of items. Since Kevin's a fan of Trans Ams, Andrew offer to allow him to drive it through the course forward, on the condition that he do it at no more than 40 km/h and stop immediately should he hit anything. However, Kevin drives at 60 km/h, fails to stop after smashing the passenger-side wing mirror and then drives through the wheel rims that make up the course's opening section, causing him to puncture his front passenger tire. Despite this, Kevin tries to claim that his performance would have been worthy of a pass had the experiment been an actual challenge, leaving the experts completely perturbed and causing both Andrew and Lenny to rail at him. Michael uses the Honda Prelude for his run and has trouble due to his insistence on only using his mirrors. While Andrew tries to advise Michael to look out the car's back window and Michael does try to do so, he dismisses this idea as being "too unfamiliar" to him and hits many objects, though still ends up posting the best run, hitting 15 objects. For Sly's run in the now-repaired Trans Am, Fred decides not to accompany him, knowing that Sly will just spend the challenge soliciting Fred's advice if he's present. This proves Fred right, as it leads to a predictably terrible performance in which Sly only looks out the back window once in his entire run (and even then due to Andrew specifically telling him to do so) and veers wildly about the course. While Sly's final total of 37 hits isn't the most of the day (Shelby ultimately ends up hitting 43 objects during his run), the experts unanimously agree his performance to be the worst in any reversing-related challenge they've ever seen (and remember, Kevin punctured his front passenger tire during his run).
Fastest Performer: Michael performed the fastest at 13:49.
Slowest Performer: Dale performed the slowest at 21:07.
Best Performer: Even though the experts considered Michael's performance very poor, he still hit fewer things than anyone else.
Worst Performer: Even though Kevin destroyed much of the course going forward and Shelby hit the most objects with 43 (mainly the result of him carelessly flooring the gas halfway through what had been a decent run), Sly was the worst due to his exceptionally dreadful reversing and lack of observational skills.
After the challenge, Kevin sends another letter to the experts, again apologizing for his actions and vowing to improve. However, this time, the experts don't buy it for a minute and demand to know Kevin's motives in sending the two letters. Despite his performance in the episode, Kevin feels that he has learned enough to graduate, but the experts tell him that, based simply on his dreadful performance in the previous challenge, he has officially blown whatever goodwill he earned in the previous two episodes and that they are now less inclined to graduate him than they ever had been during that span. Dale, Shelby and Sly once again admit that they shouldn't graduate and while Michael says that he wants to graduate, he doesn't think he really deserves to. As the drivers assemble for what would have been the graduation ceremony, Andrew says that the overall standard of driving in this episode was the worst in the entire history of the show. For the second episode in a row, Michael is the only nominee, but even then, Andrew says that the experts refused to even contemplate graduating him given that he only did especially well in The Trough, leaving Michael visibly exasperated. For the first time in the show's history, three consecutive episodes pass without a single graduation.

Episode 6: Slip and Slide
Original airdate: December 2, 2013
Camaro Challenge: Reverse Flick: The drivers are each given five attempts to reverse the Camaro into a turning area surrounded by wooden boxes and foam blocks, at which point they will be required to quickly spin the car 180° while remaining within the area. Kevin takes the challenge first and on his first four attempts, he doesn't even make it into the turning area, crashing through the entry lane markers on every turn. On his fifth attempt, he nearly goes through the lane markers again, but is able to stop and correct himself; subsequently, he successfully executes the manoeuvre and passes, shocking Lenny half to death. It's a similar story for Michael, as he also repeatedly drives through the lane markers and fails to get into the turning area. On his fifth attempt, he nearly gets the technique right, but unlike Kevin before him, accidentally hits the accelerator instead of the brake and reverses far off-course into the adjoining field. Despite having to be reminded by Andrew to adjust his seat (following on from the much taller Michael), Shelby carries out the Reverse Flick flawlessly on his first attempt and passes with ease. On her first run, Dale drives extremely slowly and backs into a lane marker. The stress of this causes her to completely forget the lesson she was taught (in turn causing the experts to again worry that her memory seems abnormally poor) and so, Andrew decides to accompany her on her second run. Despite being advised by both Andrew and Danny, she again reverses into the lane marker and then gives up. In his first two attempts, Sly veers to one side and drives far too fast, crashing through the outer wall of the turning area on both occasions. On his third attempt, however, he manages to successfully spin the car around and pass, though he admits to not really knowing how he did it.
Best Performer: Shelby, who passed on his first attempt with no difficulty.
Worst Performer: Dale, who gave up after only two runs. Of the drivers who did take all five runs, Michael did the worst by hitting the gas instead of the brake and losing control during his final run.
Michael, Dale, Sly and Kevin combine to fail 40 consecutive attempts due to constantly hitting the curb and the other vehicles and none of them ever come close to parking the bus in the right position. Shelby, who had to have his course modified in the third season so that all the obstacles were removed (despite his dreams of driving a bus one day) from having moved only  after 30 minutes of driving the bus and causing over $12,000 in damages, fares the best, eventually getting the bus parked up correctly on his final attempt, but still backs into the car behind the bus, albeit at a relatively low speed. Shelby points out to Andrew that this type of parallel parking would be legal in Europe, earning him a "European Pass."
Best Performer: Shelby, who had the only pass in the challenge, albeit on a technicality.
Worst Performer: Sly and Kevin, who repeatedly hit the cars in front of them or behind the space hard enough to noticeably damage them, as none of their 10 attempts came remotely well.
Camaro Challenge: Icy Corner: The objective of this challenge is to approach a simulated icy corner at 50 km/h, brake sharply to slow the car down and gradually release the brake to negotiate the corner without skidding. Each driver has five runs. Before his first, Kevin reveals to Andrew that he uses a walkie-talkie in his car to get directions from Lenny and, despite acknowledging it as a factor in the accident he suffered the previous year, still defends it as being a good idea, much to Andrew's exasperation. Kevin subsequently has to be guided throughout the challenge, as Lenny calls out his speed and tells him when to brake on every run, but Kevin fails each time due to driving too fast and/or braking too late, along with not looking where he wants to go. Bizarrely, Dale remembers that she passed the challenge in the sixth season, but completely forgets that Philippe taught her a lesson on how to complete the challenge minutes beforehand, much to Andrew's concern. She fails her first two runs due to braking too late and on the third, she successfully completes the challenge, but the experts refuse to acknowledge this as a pass since Danny guided her during every step of the run. Michael passes with ease on his first go, correctly remembering to look where he wants to go. In each of his runs, Shelby locks up the brakes and fails to look where he wants to go; on top of that, he goes too slowly in his final run, failing all five. Sly drives far too fast-- at 70 km/h-- in his first three runs and fails each time. Prior to his fourth, Andrew and Fred decide to tell him about this, but he still drives slightly too fast on his remaining two runs, failing them both. 
Best Performer: Michael, who had the only pass after Dale's was disallowed due to Danny coaching her.
Worst Performer: Kevin and Sly, both of whom sped and hit the brakes at the wrong time in each of their runs and consequently failed. Shelby also failed all his runs, but at least took them at the correct speed.
Kevin thinks he deserves to graduate, but the experts and Lenny quickly shoot him down, telling him that one comparatively good challenge result isn't worthy of graduating. Shelby and Michael both say they'd like to graduate, but are uncertain whether or not they should actually do so. Meanwhile, Dale and Sly are told that the experts don't believe they will ever improve and that both should give up driving sooner rather than later, but they are both adamant they will continue to drive even if named Canada's Worst Driver Ever. Once again, Shelby and Michael are the nominees. While Cam favours Michael for doing well in the Icy Corner challenge, the one he feels is most likely to save a life in the real world, the other experts all agree that Michael's mistake on his final Reverse Flick run (hitting the accelerator instead of the brake) was such a severe error that he should be barred from graduating. Therefore, Shelby, who would have graduated in the fifth episode of Canada's Worst Driver 3 if Dr. Louisa Gembora, the show's psychologist that season, hadn't convinced Phillipe, Cam (who was still a traffic sergeant at the time), Andrew and then-head instructor Scott Marshall to graduate Billie-Jean Leslie, believing that Shelby would benefit more from staying in rehab longer (a decision that led to Shelby ultimately being named the runner-up to begin with), becomes only the third graduate of the season and the first of the runners-up to successfully do so. As Shelby and Elerick drive away, Michael, who officially joins Canada's Worst Driver 4 "winner" Ashley van Ham as the only contestants in Canada's Worst Driver history with at least three nominations without graduating (Ashley was shortlisted four times without graduating before ultimately being named the worst), is left increasingly despondent and wondering whether he'll ever graduate.

Note: This episode did not display an opening title screen or broadcast the opening animation.

Episode 7: What Happened?
Original airdate: December 9, 2013
 Camaro Challenge: Handbrake J-Turn: For this challenge, which has been run in every season except Canada's Worst Driver 7, the drivers are required to make a handbrake turn in a confined space, avoid hitting a foam figurine which features the face of their nominator and drive out of the space. Each driver will have three runs. The Camaro has also been outfitted with a "cutter handbrake," due to the car's original handbrake having broken during a test run the previous day and the cutter brake being the only replacement immediately available. During the challenge, Cam pointed out that using the handbrake J-turn on public roads would be illegal as it would be considered a stunt manoeuver. Sly passes the challenge at his first attempt, much to the surprise of both Fred and Andrew, who both concede that, for the first time ever, he actually passed a challenge through grasping the technique rather than just getting lucky. Michael also passes on his first go, though comes close to hitting the boxes on the outside of the turning area. Kevin, while seeming to broadly understand the technique, fails all three runs due to staying on the gas for too long and also leaving it too late to brake, which is ironic since this was one of only two challenges Kevin passed in the previous season (the other being the Reverse Flick-- on his final attempt, no less, but only because he finally looked in his mirror), during his poor track record season. Dale, who takes the challenge in a Honda Civic rather than the Camaro, fails her first two runs due to hitting the footbrake instead of pulling the handbrake. She attempts to give up after that, but Andrew persuades to carry on and attempt a final run; her instinct to give up proves well-founded, as while she remembers to use the handbrake on her final attempt, she doesn't steer enough and crashes through the barrier, failing again.
Best Performer: Michael and Sly, who both passed on their first attempts.
Worst Performer: Dale, who tried to give up and never came close to passing.
The Cross: This challenge, previously run in the sixth season, places the drivers at the wheel of a Crown Victoria and requires them to turn the car all the way around a cross-shaped area bordered by concrete blocks. Kevin is first and his run proves relatively unimpressive, taking nearly 28 minutes to get through the cross and causing numerous bumps and scrapes to the car. Dale, who is now openly admitting she doesn't want to continue on the show for much longer, fails to make a serious effort in the challenge and causes even more damage to the car than Kevin did, taking 38 minutes to complete the challenge. Somehow, Sly proves even worse than Dale-- if that's even possible-- and takes the longest time yet (51 minutes) and hitting the car more than twice as many times as Kevin. Michael, the only contestant who never did The Cross in the second season (as this challenge was first done in the third season), is the fastest in this challenge, completing it in just under 18 minutes, but causes more damage to the car than Kevin did, albeit less than either Sly or Dale did.
Fastest Performer: Michael performed the fastest at 17:42.
Slowest Performer: Sly performed the slowest at 51:11.
Best Performer: Even though Michael completed the fastest, Kevin had the fewest hits with 29, including four scrapes.
Worst Performer: Even though Dale failed to make a serious effort, Sly not only had more hits than anyone else with 73, but also changed direction a whopping 142 times.
Limousine Slalom: In a new variation on the show's many slalom challenges, the drivers are required to negotiate a slalom of foam people in the Lincoln Town Car limousine used for the Figure-Eight Challenge earlier in the season. Each driver will have three attempts and must drive at 70 km/h in their runs. Michael, despite discussing the basic physics behind the challenge at length with Andrew, fails all three runs due to him completely releasing the accelerator while turning, which makes the limo's front-end too heavy to properly negotiate the slalom, eventually culminating in him driving into the adjoining field in his final run (something every other driver would do at least once in this challenge). Dale proves the worst performer on this challenge, going far off the track in her first run after hitting the gas rather than the brake when she left the track, then spins out on her second attempt. Andrew asks Dale to remember the techniques Shyamala taught her earlier in the season to help her keep her calm under pressure and remember the lessons, but Dale admits that she didn't actually pay any attention in their therapy session, much to the clear annoyance of Andrew and the experts. On her final attempt, Dale once again goes violently off the track, with the limo careening sideways for several dozen feet into the adjoining field. Like Michael before him, Kevin fails all three of his attempts due to gripping the steering wheel incorrectly and understeering on each of his turns. Finally, Sly ends up ensuring a 100% failure rate in this challenge; like Dale before him, he goes far off the track on his first and third attempts and hits most of the dummies on all three efforts. 
Best Performer: None of the drivers came remotely close to passing the challenge.
Worst Performer: Even though all four drivers were practically as bad as each other, Dale was called out for her lackadaisical attitude.
In the customary meeting with the experts, Sly immediately admits that, despite a rare challenge pass, he's destined for the final. Kevin initially wants to graduate, but quickly withdraws his request upon Andrew pointing out that he failed every single challenge this episode. Michael admits he didn't do especially well this episode, though doesn't think he's Canada's Worst Driver Ever. However, Dale fails to show up for her meeting with the experts and, upon further investigation by the production team, it turns out that immediately after the Slalom Challenge, she checked out of the drivers' hotel and caught a cab ride home. Much later, Dale returns sporting a heavily bandaged left hand and reveals that she has severed a tendon in one of her fingers. The experts ask how it happened and Dale initially claims not to remember, but, on further questioning, reveals that upon returning home, she found that her husband, John (one of the six people who nominated Dale three years earlier and has now since died), was not there and, in frustration, broke the front door window in an attempt to get in the house, severely cutting her hand and severing the tendon in the process. Dale attempts to claim that her actions weren't really a big deal, but Andrew points out that she attempted to quit the show, resulting in Dale giving the experts a rambling, incomprehensible speech about "personal realities" and how she sometimes exists in a different world to everyone else, causing the experts to point out that, aside from the obvious problem of her hand injury-- which will take months to heal-- making it impossible for her to continue, it now becomes painfully clear that Dale is not mentally competent to drive and they unanimously recommend that she give up driving, an idea Dale scoffs at and says that she will continue to drive until she is no longer physically able to. Because of her attempting to quit and refusing to take responsibility for her actions, the experts decide not to even afford Dale a medical-based departure-- they afforded one for Angelina three episodes earlier, with the alternative being that Angelina would be expelled otherwise-- and instead simply expel her from rehab (joining Canada's Worst Driver 2 contestant Colin Sheppard as the only person to be expelled by the experts, although Colin was expelled for an unwillingness to change), with Cam even implying an intention to contact the Ontario Ministry of Transport and ask that Dale's driver's license be put up for review. At what would have been the penultimate graduation ceremony, Andrew shocks the drivers by appearing to destroy Dale's driver's license, but reveals that what he actually destroyed was just a copy and hands the real license over to Danny, who agrees to drive Dale back home, setting the stage for an all-male finale (the first-ever instance of such in the show's history and the second to have three people of the same gender after the all-female finale in the fourth season), as Andrew announces that either Kevin, Michael or Sly will be Canada's Worst Driver Ever. During the preview at the end of the show, however, it was revealed that Dale had returned for the final graduation ceremony, leaving viewers to question whether Cam carried out his threat of contacting the Ontario Ministry of Transport to ask them for a review of Dale's license or if Dale is named Canada's Worst Driver Ever.

Episode 8: The Envelope, Please!
Original airdate: December 16, 2013
The Reverse Gauntlet: In a challenge which combines elements of the Longest Reversing Challenge Ever and the Slalom, the drivers are tasked with reversing a 1960 Lincoln Premiere down a narrow straight bordered by cars and concrete blocks, then perform a reverse slalom around a set of foam figurines, before driving the car back to the start forward. Each driver has ten attempts and must complete the course in under a minute. Sly takes six attempts just to get out of the initial straight and fares no better in the slalom section, going completely off the track twice. During the course of his runs, the car's battery dies and has to be replaced, before the engine totally breaks down after his ninth run. With the engine deemed unfixable in the time available, a Ford F-250 truck is brought in for the remainder of the challenge. Much to the surprise of Andrew and the nominators, Michael fares even worse than Sly (if that's even possible), getting out of the initial straight section on two occasions, mostly due to his continued refusal to use the technique of looking out of the back window while reversing. Kevin initially fares little better than the other two men, but starts to get the hang of the challenge and, on his seventh run, nearly gets it right, but takes a little too long to finish. On his next attempt, he successfully passes with a full 12 seconds to spare, six seconds faster than it took Andrew to demonstrate. Since Sly had one attempt left, he's allowed to take it in the truck and immediately fails by violently hitting the first vehicle bordering the initial straight, smashing the driver's side taillight in the process.
Best Performer: Kevin, who was the only one to pass, beating Andrew's demonstration time by six seconds.
Worst Performer: Michael and Sly, who both failed to come close to passing, albeit Michael had looked worse until Sly's "colossal fail" (as Andrew notes) on his final run.
Camaro Challenge: The Mega-Challenge: For what Andrew claims to be the show's most demanding Mega-Challenge yet, the drivers will each begin with a combined Eye of the Needle and Slalom, which ends in an Icy Corner that they have to safely negotiate. The drivers then have to navigate a forward section of wheel rims, then turn the car around in a space enclosed by concrete barriers, before ending the challenge with a reverse-flick. Sly goes first and hits nearly every arch and foam person in the initial section, then fails the Icy Corner. He then hits a lot of wheel rims in the forward section, dents and scrapes the Camaro in the concrete turning space and knocks over even more wheel rims in the reversing section. After getting wedged on some rims, he gets out to remove them, but accidentally leaves the Camaro in reverse, resulting in it taking off without him and not stopping until it gets wedged on more rims. Finally, Sly attempts the reverse flick far too late and understeers, ensuring a total failure in every aspect of the challenge. Kevin gets off to a great start and performs both the Eye of the Needle/Slalom combo and the Icy Corner flawlessly, causing Andrew to congratulate him just before he begins the wheel rim section. His congratulations prove premature, however, as Kevin starts knocking down the rims and his mounting stress causes the run to rapidly fall apart, with Kevin again heavily scraping the car while turning it around, knocking down even more wheel rims in reverse and then getting the reverse flick spectacularly wrong and destroying the left-hand side of the turning area. Michael has the final run and gets the initial straight right without hitting any arches or foam people, but then fails the Icy Corner. Like Kevin, his mounting stress then causes him to start knocking down the wheel rims; he at least turns the Camaro around without hitting anything, but continues to knock down rims in the reverse section and then fails the reverse flick when he turns the steering wheel the wrong way, leaving Michael visibly angry with himself.
Best Performer: Kevin, who completed everything up until the Icy Corner flawlessly.
Worst Performer: Sly, who didn't successfully complete a single part of the challenge.
Road Test: As in the previous two seasons, the final road test takes place in Hamilton, Ontario, this time in a Corvette, with the beginning and ending in the Hamilton City Hall Municipal Service Centre parking lot at the intersection of Hunter Street West and Park Street South. Michael is first up and his run initially goes well, driving confidently, following directions and even negotiating some confusing intersections. However, he screws up mid-drive by running two red lights in quick succession (the intersection of James Street North and Cannon Street and the intersection of King Street West and Hess Street North), but otherwise, his run goes very smoothly and he handles the highway drive with no trouble at all, although Michael ends up feeling disappointed about the two moving violations that would have only cost him $650 had he been caught, a far cry from the six moving violations he committed during his Toronto drive seven years ago, a drive that, again, took just over three hours to complete, yet the fact he "attacked the Toronto drive head-on" (in Andrew's words during the trophy ceremony that season) saved him being named Canada's Worst Driver. To Andrew's shock, Sly's drive goes even better and other than excessive shoulder-checking, he doesn't make a single mistake on the drive, a far cry from when he stopped in the middle of an intersection trying to read the crossing street signs during his initial final drive two years earlier. However, much like his previous final drive, Sly only half-heartedly promises not to eat or use handheld gadgets while in the car, causing Andrew to ponder whether he should still be named Canada's Worst Driver Ever. Despite performing the best in the two prior challenges, Kevin's run proves to be by far the worst; within the opening minutes, he turns left from the middle lane onto Caroline Street South (after he promised Andrew following the Mega-Challenge that he wouldn't), then does it again when trying to turn onto Hughson Street South from Main Street East and, to Andrew's shock, tries to deny having done it. He then commits a serious offense by passing a stopped police car on Arkledun Avenue without changing lanes (something Cam notes is usually an instant $490 fine, demerit points and possibly jail) and as the drive continues, he scrapes the Corvette's bumper while turning around, makes several illegal lane changes, runs a red light and then stops in the middle of the intersection of King Street West and Summers Lane, resulting in his 13th moving violation. Andrew twice has to prevent Kevin from turning left onto the MacNab Street Bus Terminal from the middle lane of King Street West and onto King Street East from the middle lane of Hughson Street South (which would have caused him to collide with a bus and a car, respectively) and after the second such incident, Kevin pulls over into the parking lot of the Pioneer gas station on King Street West while heading for the highway (which wasn't shown), phones Lenny and concedes he's Canada's Worst Driver Ever and suggests giving up driving. Lenny tells him to finish the drive (proving not to be the voice of reason Andrew thought), but Andrew tells Kevin that should he commit any more ticketable offenses, the drive will be stopped immediately. Sure enough, Kevin does just that when he subsequently turns from Main Street West onto James Street South and into an oncoming traffic lane and fails to realize this until Andrew points it out, leading to him stopping just yards short of a collision with a car coming from the other direction; this proves to be the final straw for Andrew as he calls a halt to the drive and takes Kevin to the Impark parking lot at the corner of James Street North and King William Street himself, as it's the closest parking lot around. Kevin becomes completely despondent, snaps at Andrew and then breaks down in tears when calling Lenny on the phone again. Andrew notes that with Sly's drive being flawless and Michael having done relatively well on his, despite running two red lights (and "barring a miracle," as Andrew notes), Kevin's status as Canada's Worst Driver Ever is now all but assured.
Best Performer: Sly, who didn't commit a single ticketable offense during his drive.
Worst Performer: Kevin, whose driving was so dangerous that Andrew was eventually forced to stop the drive after he nearly collided head-on with another car.
In his final meeting with the judges, Kevin gives a rather unconvincing answer when asked if he intends to follow through with his promise of quitting driving, prompting Andrew to call in Lenny, who in turn reveals that Kevin told him he would only temporarily give up driving and take lessons to improve his skills (a far cry from what Lenny said in the audition video that "he's made a vow to me-- referring to Kevin-- that if he doesn't graduate this year or if the panel says stop driving, he will stop driving altogether and cut up his license"), leaving the experts disconcerted by Kevin's actions and Lenny is shown a video of Kevin's final drive to show just how unfit to drive he is. Michael is convinced that he is not the worst, while Sly admits that, despite his road test performance, he honestly doesn't believe he is a better driver than either Kevin or Michael. In the final discussion as to who is the worst, Shyamala and Philippe make a shocking suggestion-- that, despite having been expelled the previous episode, Dale should still be named Canada's Worst Driver Ever for not even participating in the final challenges and road test and her unstable behaviour during both her stints in rehab. However, Andrew and Cam believe that Kevin is worse, with Cam noting that he had a serious accident within the past year (as Kevin admitted to Andrew at the beginning of the season) and that, for all her faults, Dale hasn't had any such serious accidents in recent years, leaving Tim with the deciding vote. As Kevin, Michael and Sly assemble for the trophy presentation, a van pulls up and Dale gets out, surprising everybody. Andrew begins by announcing that Michael is not Canada's Worst Driver Ever and returns his license to him. As Michael and Eric drive away, Andrew's voiceover notes that while he still has a lot of improving to do, Michael is clearly a much better driver now than in his original appearance and definitely not Canada's Worst Driver Ever. History then repeats itself, as Sly's strong final drive manages to override his horrible track record in the contest and saves him from being named the worst (as previously happened in the seventh season). Due to his poor overall performance and the fact that he ultimately showed no improvement over his previous appearance, however, Andrew asks Fred to drive Sly home, while recommending that Sly only drive when absolutely necessary from now on. Despite believing she will be named the worst, history repeats itself for Dale as well, as she avoids the title due to the experts feeling she was a little more aware of the dangers of driving than Kevin and Cam predicting that her license will soon be revoked anyway. Therefore, Kevin is named the outright worst this time and Andrew presents him with the trophy, then lights a road flare and asks Kevin to use it to destroy his license. Kevin initially refuses to do so, but Lenny forces him to go through with it and the license is completely burned away by the flare, after which Lenny drives Kevin away. In an ending voiceover, Andrew reveals that while Kevin hasn't driven since the show was filmed, he has both failed to sell his existing car and bought a replacement.

References

External links
 

Ever
2013 Canadian television seasons